Unniella is a genus of non-biting midges of the bloodworm family Chironomidae.

Chironomidae